A Polka Just for Me is an album by Jimmy Sturr and His Orchestra released in 1987, featuring the Jordanaires. In 1988, the album earned Sturr the Grammy Award for Best Polka Recording.

See also
 Polka in the United States

References

1987 albums
Jimmy Sturr albums
Grammy Award for Best Polka Album